The RAF-2203 Latvija (nickname Rafik) was a cabover van designed and developed by Rīgas Autobusu Fabrika from 1976 to 1997. They were widely used throughout the USSR as fixed-run taxis (marshrutkas), medical cars, used for trade and as a special services vehicles. It was the successor of the RAF-977.

This van used the  engine of the GAZ-24, between the front seats, making its construction similar to other competing vans such as the Dodge A100 and the Volkswagen LT, with independent front suspension also from the GAZ-24 (but springs from the GAZ-13). It borrowed headlights and brake system parts from the Moskvitch 412, outside door handles from the Moskvitch 408, and  wheels of the GAZ-21 Volga. The single rear door hinged at the top, rather than the more-usual side-opening. (The 2203-02 would run on liquified propane). An ambulance, the 22031, was soon added to the range, and made up fully a third of all 2203s built; there was also a 22035 for blood donor clinics. These were joined by the 22034, for fire departments.

In addition to the uncommon 22033 and 22036 for state militias, there were prototype electric vehicles.

While the 2203 looked good, it was susceptible to rust, especially in the frame rails, and was unpleasant to drive in bad weather. Quality control of the assembly was also poor. Oil leaks and axle bearing failures were frequent. It also suffered overheating, serious vibration issues, failures of front suspension parts leading to poor handling, and high fuel consumption. On top of it all, access to the cab was difficult, despite the forward-control position.

After RAF went bankrupt, production was picked up by GAZ, who quickly replaced it with the GAZelle.

Variants 

 RAF-2203 Latvija – 4x2 4dr van, 1976
 RAF-2203 Latvija [delivery] – 4x2 4dr delivery van
 RAF-2203 Latvija [cardiology] – 4x2 4dr cardiac ambulance
 RAF-2203 Latvija [fire] – 4x2 4dr fire minivan
 RAF-2203 Latvija GAI – 4x2 4dr police van
 RAF-2203 Latvija [mail] – 4x2 4dr mail van
 RAF-2203 Latvija [taxi] – 4x2 4dr taxi van
 RAF-2203 Latvija VAI – 4x2 4dr military police van
 RAF-22031 Latvija – 4x2 4dr ambulance
 RAF-2907 – special car based on RAF-2203

Gallery

References

1970s cars
1980s cars
1990s cars
Riga Autobus Factory vehicles
Vans
Minibuses
Taxi vehicles
Ambulances
Cab over vehicles
Police vehicles
Buses of the Soviet Union
Vehicles introduced in 1976
Motor vehicles manufactured in Latvia